FedEx Express Flight 630 was a regular scheduled cargo flight from Seattle-Tacoma International Airport to Memphis International Airport, Memphis, Tennessee. On July 28, 2006, the McDonnell Douglas MD-10-10F
operating the flight, crashed upon landing due to a landing gear failure. The main left undercarriage collapsed seven seconds after touchdown causing the MD-10 to roll off the runway out of control. The aircraft finally came to a stop near taxiway M4 and caught fire. The fire consumed the wing and port engine and the crash and evacuation left the two crew members and the sole passenger, an off-duty crew member, injured.

Aircraft and crew

The aircraft involved was a 32-year old McDonnell Douglas MD-10-10F, registration N391FE, built in mid-1974 and delivered to FedEx Express on May 21, 1997. Like quite a few of FedEx MD-10s, this aircraft was originally delivered to United Airlines (N391FE was originally delivered to United Airlines in February 1975 as N1826U). While in service with United, the aircraft was temporarily leased to two other airlines, World Airways and Leisure Air. With Line Number 169 and Construction Number (MSN) 46625, the aircraft was 32.2 years old at the time of the accident. The airframe was written off as a result of the incident and broken up shortly thereafter. The aircraft was nicknamed Chandra.

At the time of the crash, FedEx had 81 other McDonnell Douglas MD-10Fs in its fleet.

The captain was 57-year-old Jayne C. Akin, who had been working for FedEx Express since 1979. She had 16,000 flight hours, including 4,223 hours on the MD-10/11. The first officer was 38-year-old Andrew D. Macha, who had been with the airline since 2004 and had 5,000 flight hours, with 300-350 of them on the MD-10/11. Macha previously served for the U.S. Air Force from 1991 to 2004.

Accident
FedEx Flight 630 was a regular scheduled cargo flight from Seattle-Tacoma International Airport to Memphis International Airport, Memphis, Tennessee which was operated by the company's 82 McDonnell Douglas MD-10F aircraft. On 28 July, N391FE was conducting a visual approach to runway 18R which was initially flown with the autopilot engaged and coupled to the ILS. The first officer was the pilot flying for the landing. At 1600 feet the airplane was configured for a landing. At 400 feet the autopilot was disconnected, the final approach segment was smooth. Upon touchdown, the left main gear collapsed without warning, causing the left wing to contact the runway, with the jet veering violently to the left and eventually coming to a stop near taxiway M4.

Investigation
The NTSB launched an investigation into the crash. The final report, released in 2008, cited a fatigue crack in the air filler valve hole caused by inadequate maintenance.

References

External links 

 NTSB investigation docket

Airliner accidents and incidents in Tennessee
Aviation accidents and incidents in the United States in 2006
Accidents and incidents involving the McDonnell Douglas DC-10
630
History of Memphis, Tennessee
2006 in Tennessee
Memphis International Airport